Frederick Corbett (1 January 1881 – 15 April 1924) was a professional footballer who played for Thames Ironworks (where he worked as a labourer) and the club's successor West Ham United, before spending three spells at Bristol Rovers punctuated by time at Bristol City and Brentford. Following his final departure from Bristol Rovers in 1911 he joined New Brompton. He was one of the first black footballers to play in the Football League.

Corbett made three appearances in the Southern League for Thames Ironworks, and played a total of 139 games for Bristol Rovers in the same competition, scoring 52 goals.

Sources

1881 births
1924 deaths
Footballers from West Ham
English footballers
Association football forwards
West Ham United F.C. players
Bristol Rovers F.C. players
Bristol City F.C. players
Brentford F.C. players
Gillingham F.C. players
Southern Football League players
Black British sportsmen
Thames Ironworks F.C. players
English Football League players